The Atatürk's  House, also known as Great Offensive Headquarters, is a historic house museum in Şuhut district of Afyonkarahisar Province, Turkey, which was used as temporary headquarters by then Commander-in-Chief Mustafa Kemal Pasha (Atatürk) right before the Great Offensive in August 1922. The museum was established in 2004 following restorations.

See also
Atatürk Museums in Turkey

References

External links

Museums in Afyonkarahisar Province
Suhut
Museums established in 2004
Historic house museums in Turkey
2004 establishments in Turkey
Turkish War of Independence